Tris(hydroxymethyl)phosphine is the organophosphorus compound with the formula P(CH2OH)3.  It is a white solid.  The compound is multifunctional, consisting of three alcohol functional groups and a tertiary phosphine.  It is prepared by treating tetrakis(hydroxymethyl)phosphonium chloride with strong base:
[P(CH2OH)4]Cl + NaOH → P(CH2OH)3 + H2O + H2C=O + NaCl
The compound can be prepared on a large scale using triethylamine as base and as solvent.

Reactions
The compound forms complexes with a variety of metals.  These complexes display some solubility in water but more so in methanol.
The compound decomposes violently to phosphine and formaldehyde upon attempted distillation.  In air, it oxidizes to the oxide.

Upon heating with hexamethylenetetramine, it converts to triazaphosphaadamantane.

References

Tertiary phosphines